Two-piece or Two piece or Two pieces may refer to:

 Bikini, a two-piece swimsuit
 Double act, a comedy duo
 Two-piece band, a musical ensemble with two members, a duo
 Two-piece gel encapsulation, a method of preparing a Capsule (pharmacy) containing a dose of medicine, invented in 1847
 Two piece implant, a form of Abutment (dentistry), a connecting element
 Two-piece lapping, a version of the machining process Lapping
 Two-piece sobralia (Sobralia dichotoma), an orchid found in South America
 Two-piece suit, a set of garments made from the same cloth; see Suit (clothing)
 Two-piece tmRNAs, a type of Transfer-messenger RNA

 Music
 "Two Pieces", a song on the record Demi (album) of 2013 by Demi Lovato (born 1992)
 Two Pieces for Piano (1921), a composition by John Ireland (18791962)
 Two Pieces for Piano (1925), a composition by John Ireland (18791962)
 Two Pieces for Piano (1929-30), a composition by John Ireland (18791962)
 Two Pieces for Wind Quintet (Ropartz), a composition of 1924 by Guy Ropartz (18641955)

 Sculpture
 Knife Edge Two Piece 1962–65, a bronze sculpture by Henry Moore (18981986)
 Two-Piece Reclining Figure No. 9, a bronze sculpture of 1967 by Henry Moore
 Two-Piece Reclining Figure: Points, a bronze sculpture of 196970 by Henry Moore

See also 
 Duo (disambiguation)
 Duet (disambiguation)
 One-piece (disambiguation)
 Three-piece (disambiguation)